During the 1994–95 English football season, Luton Town F.C. competed in the Football League First Division.

Season summary
Luton struggled once again in the 1994–95 season, with the side struggling to score at home. Pleat's Luton side, including young players such as Oakes, Telfer and John Hartson, reacted positively when Pleat turned down the advances of Tottenham Hotspur to return to North London as manager, and rocketed up to fifth in the table. Hartson was bought by Arsenal for £2,500,000 soon after, a British record for a teenager. The season petered out into obscurity following Hartson's sale, and Luton finished 16th. Pleat then left for a second time, moving to Sheffield Wednesday.

Final league table

Results
Luton Town's score comes first

Legend

Football League First Division

FA Cup

League Cup

Squad

References

Luton Town F.C. seasons
Luton Town